Cantwell is a surname of Norman origin, originally de Conteville. The surname is from Ireland, found also in English speaking countries such the United Kingdom, United States, Australia, New Zealand, and Canada.

People with the surname
Christian Cantwell (born 1980), American shot putter
Christopher Cantwell (white supremacist) (born 1980)
Christopher Cantwell (filmmaker), co-creator of the TV series Halt and Catch Fire
Georgina Cantwell (born 1990), contestant on Big Brother UK in 2016, Millionaire Heiress
Hendrika B. Cantwell (born 1925), Dutch-American professor of pediatrics, advocate for abused and neglected children
John Joseph Cantwell, first archbishop of the Roman Catholic Archdiocese of Los Angeles
John Patrick Cantwell (born 1956), Major General in the Australian Army
Lesley Cantwell (1987–2013), New Zealand racewalker
 Lloyd Cantwell, alias used by Whitaker Chambers (1901–1961) after his friend Robert Cantwell (1908–1978)
Maria Cantwell (born 1958), U.S. Senator from the state of Washington
Mary Cantwell (1930–2000), American-born journalist and novelist who served on the New York Times editorial board
Michael J. Cantwell (1837-1903), American politician
Noel Cantwell (1932–2005), Irish cricketer and football
Robert Cantwell (1908–1978), American novelist and critic
Robert Cantwell (architect) (c. 1793-1859), British architect
Steve Cantwell (born 1986), American mixed martial arts fighter
Todd Cantwell (born 1998), English footballer

See also
Cantwell (disambiguation)
Cantwell Fada
Cantwell's Court
Herluin de Conteville

References 

Surnames of Irish origin
Norman-language surnames
Surnames of British Isles origin
English-language surnames